The National University of Chilecito (UNDEC) is an Argentine national university situated in the city of Chilecito, La Rioja. The institution was established on December 16, 2002, on the Chilecito campus of the National University of La Rioja. It maintains schools of Law, Engineering, Licentiate, Technology, and Education.

See also

Science and Education in Argentina
Argentine Higher Education Official Site 
 Argentine Universities

2002 establishments in Argentina
Argentine national universities
Educational institutions established in 2002
Universities in La Rioja Province, Argentina